The White House Coronavirus Task Force was the United States Department of State task force during the Trump administration that "coordinate[d] and overs[aw] the administration's efforts to monitor, prevent, contain, and mitigate the spread" of coronavirus disease 2019 (COVID-19). Also referred to as the President's Coronavirus Task Force, it was established on January 29, 2020, with Secretary of Health and Human Services Alex Azar as chair. On February 26, 2020, U.S. vice president Mike Pence was named to chair the task force, and Deborah Birx was named the response coordinator.

The task force was succeeded by the White House COVID-19 Response Team under the Biden administration.

Background
The first known case in the United States of COVID-19 was confirmed in the state of Washington on January 20, 2020, in a 35-year-old man who had returned from Wuhan, China on January 15. The White House Coronavirus Task Force was established on January 29, with Secretary of Health and Human Services Alex Azar as its chair. On January 30, the WHO declared a Public Health Emergency of International Concern and on January 31, the Trump administration declared a public health emergency, and placed travel restrictions on entry by non-citizens who had recently been in China. On February 26, U.S. vice president Mike Pence replaced Azar as chair.

Members

Actions

The task force reviewed all coronavirus-related actions by federal agencies, and overruled the Centers for Disease Control and Prevention (CDC) several times. The New York Times reported that the CDC's leadership has been criticized during the pandemic, for mismanaging the testing kit rollout and changing its guidance on transmission of the virus; the White House says it is following the science in overruling the CDC. In March 2020, the task force deployed a team to cope with test kit shortages across the country, overseen by Brett Giroir, recognizing that the shortages were a serious threat to the country.

Pete Gaynor, the administrator of the Federal Emergency Management Agency (FEMA) was involved and stated that the task force had directed FEMA to shift in March "from playing a supporting role in assisting the U.S Department of Health and Human Services, which was designated as the initial lead federal agency for the COVID-19 pandemic response, to coordinating the Whole-of Government response to the COVID-19 pandemic".

Peter Navarro was named in March the Defense Production Act policy coordinator for the federal government. The Defense Production Act gives the President broad powers to control manufacturing during emergencies. Navarro criticized the CDC for the testing problems, and has also criticized Fauci; critics like Chuck Schumer say Navarro is unqualified for the job.

Operation Warp Speed was initiated in early April to facilitate and accelerate the development, manufacturing, and distribution of COVID-19 vaccines, therapeutics, and diagnostics after a round-table meeting with Trump, Pence and industry executives at the White House on March 2.

On September 29, the task force overruled the CDC's recommendation regarding when passenger cruise ships should be allowed to resume sailing. The CDC wanted to extend the existing "no-sail" directive until February 2021, but the task force agreed with the cruise ship industry's recommendation that the prohibition end on October 31, 2020. Two unnamed federal health officials told The New York Times that on October 9 the task force rejected a proposed CDC order requiring passengers and employees to wear masks on all forms of public and commercial transportation in the United States, including airplanes, trains, buses, subways, and transit hubs. A federal mask mandate was supported by some airlines and the transportation worker unions; the task force said that such orders should be left up to states and local governments.

Press briefings
On March 10, 2020, The Hill reported that U.S. Senate Republicans who had attended a briefing with President Donald Trump had encouraged him to hold more briefings and to make Anthony Fauci the "face of the federal government's response" because according to an unnamed senator, "he has credibility", he "speaks with authority" and he "has respect in the medical community". The role of Health and Human Services secretary Alex Azar was downsized, according to The Wall Street Journal, with Pence taking a larger role.

The Task Force livestreamed press briefings at whitehouse.gov to communicate updates, guidelines, and policy changes to the public during the COVID-19 pandemic in the United States. On March 16, the White House began holding the task force press briefings daily, but by late April the White House discussed reducing the frequency of these briefings. On April 25, there was no press briefing, and at that time no further press briefings had been scheduled. On May 5, Pence said that the administration was discussing "what the proper time is for the task force to complete its work"; the next day, Trump said that the task force would "continue on indefinitely" but would refocus on returning the nation to normal activity.

As the US entered a new phase of re-opening businesses and getting back to work, Pence named five new members to the task force on May 15, 2020. The task force gave a press briefing on May 15, and on May 22, Birx appeared with press secretary Kayleigh McEnany. For the rest of May and into June, the task force met once or twice weekly, behind closed doors, as the White House switched to an economic message. The task force gave another press briefing on July 8. Fauci said on July 10 that he had not given a briefing to Trump for two months, and had not seen him in person since June 2.

See also
 Scott Atlas, advisor to the task force
 John Fleming, assistant to the President for Planning and Implementation, and liaison to White House Chief of Staff
 Olivia Troye, former top aide to the White House Coronavirus Task Force
 Great American Economic Revival Industry Groups
 COVID-19 Advisory Board
 White House COVID-19 Response Team

References

External links

 

National responses to the COVID-19 pandemic
Organizations established for the COVID-19 pandemic
Presidency of Donald Trump
Task forces
United States Department of State
United States Presidential Task Forces
U.S. federal government response to the COVID-19 pandemic
2020 establishments in the United States
2021 disestablishments in the United States